David Riley (died July 7, 1901) was an American politician and physician from Maryland. He served as a member of the Maryland House of Delegates, representing Harford County from 1872 to 1874.

Early life
David Riley was born to Susanna Riley. He graduated from the University of Maryland.

Career
Riley was a Democrat. He served as a member of the Maryland House of Delegates, representing Harford County from 1872 to 1874. Riley ran for the Democratic nomination for state delegate in the 1879 election, but lost.

In 1880, Riley was appointed as clerk of the committee on claims.  Riley was a delegate to the Maryland State Democratic Convention in 1887.

Riley practiced medicine in Dublin, Maryland, for 40 years. Riley was elected as president of the Harford County Medical Society in 1881. He was appointed as a vaccine physician in his district in 1882.

In 1883-1884 and from 1887 to 1890 and 1891 to 1898, Riley was a trustee of Dublin School No. 13.

Personal life
Riley married and had seven children, Mrs. William Clement, Ella May (married David G. Clement), Mrs. J. M. C. Merrick, Annie, H. S., William T. and F. P. He lived in Dublin.

Riley died following treatment on July 7, 1901, at the age of 64, at Farmhurst Hospital in Wilmington, Delaware. He was interred at Dublin Methodist Episcopal Church in Dublin.

References

Year of birth uncertain
1830s births
1901 deaths
People from Harford County, Maryland
University System of Maryland alumni
Democratic Party members of the Maryland House of Delegates
Physicians from Maryland